Liar's Poker is a 1998 American crime drama film directed by Jeff Santo, starring Richard Tyson, Caesar Luisi, Jimmy Blondell and Flea.

Cast
 Richard Tyson as Jack
 Caesar Luisi as Niko
 Jimmy Blondell as Vic
 Flea as Frankie
 Neith Hunter as Brooke
 Pamela Gidley as Linda
 Amelia Heinle as Rebecca
 Colin Patrick Lynch as Art

Release
The film premiered at the Chicago Alt.film Fest on 10 June 1998.

Reception
Michael Speier of Variety wrote that while the film " gets more creative toward its finale", it "can’t atone" for "narrative inconsistencies", "very bland acting" and the "lack of personality development".

Derek Armstrong of TV Guide wrote that "The viewer will give up on the plot ten minutes in, not because it's too complex, but because the script never bothers even to lay the groundwork", and Santos' "amateurish, pointless cross-cutting takes over from there."

Eric Harrison of the Los Angeles Times wrote that the film "plays like a young filmmaker’s attempt to see how much he could strip from his story without losing the audience" and that "Character, motivation, most of the plot--this movie’s been boiled so hard they all dropped from its bones."

References

External links
 
 

American crime drama films
1998 crime drama films